Freedom For The Stallion is the debut album by The Hues Corporation released in 1973.

The album includes the original recording of "Rock The Boat." A later re-mix version of this recording became one of the first Disco hits in 1974 and reached #1 on the Billboard Hot 100 in the United States.

The title track, "Freedom for the Stallion" was also a minor hit. This Allen Toussaint song had been recorded earlier by Lee Dorsey in 1971. Later versions of "Freedom for the Stallion" include Three Dog Night on their 1972 album Seven Separate Fools, The Oak Ridge Boys on their 1974 self-titled Columbia Records debut, a 1974 single by Canadian pop-rock band Edward Bear (#20 Can), and a 2006 recording by Toussaint and Elvis Costello on the album The River in Reverse.

Track listing
"Bound on a Reason" - (Michael Jarrett)  3:15
"Off My Cloud" - (Wally Holmes)  4:16
"All Goin' Down Together" - (Michael Jarrett)  2:51
"Rock the Boat" - (Wally Holmes) 3:22
"Freedom for the Stallion" - (Allen Toussaint)  4:00
"The Family" - (John Hurley, Ronnie Wilkins)  3:09
"Go To The Poet" - (Wally Holmes)  2:51
"Salvation Lady" (1-3-5) - (John Hurley, Ronnie Wilkins)  3:18
"Live a Lie" - (Wally Holmes) 2:13
"Miracle Maker (Sweet Soul Shaker)" - (Barry Mann, Cynthia Weil)  3:16

Personnel
St. Clair Lee, Fleming Williams, Hubert Ann Kelley - Vocals
Joe Sample - Keyboards
Hal Blaine, Jim Gordon, Ronnie Tutt, Bobby Perez - Drums
David Hungate, Joe Osborn, Wilton Felder, James Jamerson - Bass
Al Casey, Dennis Budimir, Larry Carlton, Louie Shelton - Guitar
William E. Green - Baritone saxophone
Charles Loper, Lew McCreary - Trombone
Bud Brisbois, Charles B. Findley, Paul Hubinon - Trumpet
Gary Coleman - Percussion
Chino Valdes - Congas
Edgar Lustgarten - Cello
Harry Bluestone, Israel Baker, James Getzoff, Sidney Sharp - Violin
David Schwartz - Viola
D'Arneill Pershing, Gene Page, Perry Botkin, Jr., Tom Sellers - arrangements

Charts

Album

Single

References

External links
 Hues Corporation-Freedom For The Stallion at Discogs

1973 debut albums
Albums arranged by Gene Page
Albums arranged by Perry Botkin Jr.
RCA Records albums
Soul albums by American artists